The city of Caruthersville, Missouri, located in Missouri's 8th congressional district in southeastern Missouri, is the county seat of Pemiscot County, Missouri.

References
 Missouri Secretary of State official manuals

Key

Caruthersville